Andhi Mayakkam is a 1981 Indian Tamil-language film directed by Banudasan for producer A.V.Raja Reddiyar. The film stars Vanitha Krishnachandran in the lead role.

Cast 

Manoj
Vinoth
Vanitha
Gandhimathi

Soundtrack 
Soundtrack was composed by Shyam.
"Poove Vaa" - SPB
"Moodi Vecha" - Malaysia Vasudevan, Vani Jairam
"Aatha Vandhen" - S. Janaki 
Lyrics were written by Vairamuthu

References

External links
Full movie

1981 films
1980s Tamil-language films
Films scored by Shyam (composer)
Indian romance films
1980s romance films